The Colombia national under-17 football team represents Colombia in international under-17 football competitions and is overseen by the Colombian Football Federation.

The team's most notable performances in the FIFA U-17 World Cup was both in 2003 and 2009, where they achieved fourth place. Colombia won the South American Under-17 Football Championship in the 1993 tournament held in Colombia.

Competitive record
*Draws include knockout matches decided on penalty kicks.
**Gold background colour indicates that the tournament was won.
***Red border colour indicates tournament was held on home soil.

 Champions   Runners-up  Third Place   Fourth place

FIFA U-17 World Cup

South American Under-17 Football Championship
It serves also as qualification for the World Cup.

Schedule and results

2017

2019

Current squad
The following 23 players were named for the 2019 South American U-17 Championship.

Honours
FIFA U-17 World Cup
 Fourth place (2): 2003, 2009
South American Under-17 Football Championship
Winners (1): 1993
Runners-up (1): 2007
 Third place (2): 1988, 2003
 Fourth place (2): 2005, 2009
Bolivarian Games
Champions (4): 1997 Arequipa, 2005 Colombia, 2013 Trujillo, 2017 Santa Marta
Runners-up (2): 1993 Bolivia, 2001 Ambato
South American Games
Champions (3): 1994 Valencia, 2010 Medellín, 2014 Santiago

Coaching staff

See also
 Colombia national football team
 Colombia national futsal team
 Colombia Olympic football team
 Colombia national under-20 football team
 Colombia national under-15 football team

References

External links
 FIFA.com: FIFA U-17 World Championship Finland 2003
 FCF.com.co Plantilla de jugadores 
 CONMEBOL.com
 Bolivarian Games: Soccer Tournaments RSSSF page

F
South American national under-17 association football teams